In Contempt is a television show on BET created by Terri Kopp and starring Erica Ash. BET ordered 10 episodes straight-to-series. The series explores injustice in the American legal system. The series premiered on April 10, 2018. In September 2019, the series was canceled by BET after one season.

Plot
The procedurals is in the fast-paced world of a legal aid office in New York City and follows Gwen Sullivan (Erica Ash), an opinionated attorney whose passion for her job and clients make her arguably the most talented public defender in her district.

Cast and Characters
 Erica Ash as Gwendolyn "Gwen" Sullivan, a public defender
 Richard Lawson as Earl Sullivan, Gwen's father, a retired judge
 Christian Keyes as Charles Theodore "Charlie" Riggs, an attorney with an ego who is Gwen's boss and friends with benefits
 Megan Hutchings as Tracy Campbell, a public defender and Gwen's roommate
 Mouna Traoré as Vanessa Winters, a rookie attorney learning what it means to be woke
 Tobias Truvillion as Bennett Thompson, Gwen's longtime secret crush and former law professor
 Daniel Kash as Tom Delgado, Gwen's boss 
 Ronnie Rowe. Jr. as E.J Dashay, an Assistant District Attorney and Gwen's professional nemesis

Recurring
 Richard Lawson as Earl Sullivan, Gwen's father, a retired judge
 Jonathan Langdon as Jim Johnson, a court officer
 Rob Stewart as Judge Dotson
 Joy Tanner as Audrey Dotson, Judge Dotson's wife 
 Shawn Lawrence as Judge Adler
 Genelle Williams as Alison Bontemps, Bennett's fiancé

Episodes

Production
In Contempt is being written by Terri Kopp and produced in Canada. On September 25, 2019, BET officially canceled the series after one season.

References

External links
Official Website

2010s American legal television series
BET original programming
2018 American television series debuts
2018 American television series endings
2010s American drama television series